Lü Yan (born 25 July 1972), is a Chinese former ice hockey player who played at the 1998 Winter Olympics where China finished 4th in the woman tournament.

References

1972 births
Living people
Chinese women's ice hockey players
Ice hockey players at the 1998 Winter Olympics
Ice hockey players at the 2002 Winter Olympics
Olympic ice hockey players of China
Asian Games gold medalists for China
Asian Games bronze medalists for China
Ice hockey players at the 1999 Asian Winter Games
Ice hockey players at the 2003 Asian Winter Games
Medalists at the 1999 Asian Winter Games
Medalists at the 2003 Asian Winter Games
Asian Games medalists in ice hockey